Behrman is a surname. Notable people with the surname include:

Dave Behrman
David Behrman
Greg Berhman, founder & CEO of NationSwell
Martin Behrman
SS Martin Behrman, named after him
Joy Behrman
S. N. Behrman

See also
Berman
Behrmann